Yuxarı Əngilan is a former village in the Khizi Rayon of Azerbaijan.

References 

Populated places in Khizi District